Henry Ashley (1548 – after 1605) was an English politician.

He was a Member (MP) of the Parliament of England for Wareham in 1572, Christchurch in 1586 and Poole in 1589.

References

1548 births
17th-century deaths
English MPs 1572–1583
English MPs 1586–1587
English MPs 1589